Diosma is a genus of flowering plants in the family Rutaceae, native to Cape Provinces of South Africa. The genus was first described by Carl Linnaeus in 1753.

Species
, Plants of the World Online accepted the following species:

Diosma acmaeophylla Eckl. & Zeyh.
Diosma apetala (Dümmer) I.Williams
Diosma arenicola I.Williams
Diosma aristata I.Williams
Diosma aspalathoides Lam.
Diosma awilana I.Williams
Diosma demissa I.Williams
Diosma dichotoma P.J.Bergius
Diosma echinulata I.Williams
Diosma fallax I.Williams
Diosma guthriei Glover
Diosma haelkraalensis I.Williams
Diosma hirsuta L.
Diosma meyeriana Spreng.
Diosma oppositifolia L.
Diosma parvula I.Williams
Diosma passerinoides Steud.
Diosma pedicellata I.Williams
Diosma pilosa I.Williams
Diosma prama I.Williams
Diosma ramosissima Bartl. & H.L.Wendl.
Diosma recurva Cham.
Diosma rourkei I.Williams
Diosma sabulosa I.Williams
Diosma strumosa I.Williams
Diosma subulata J.C.Wendl.
Diosma tenella I.Williams
Diosma thyrsophora Eckl. & Zeyh.

References

Zanthoxyloideae
Zanthoxyloideae genera